Lonely Child is a piece for soprano and orchestra by Claude Vivier, written in 1980. It is arguably his most well-known piece, and is considered a hallmark composition in the genre of spectral music.

References

Citations

Sources
 
 
 

1980 compositions
Compositions by Claude Vivier
Compositions that use extended techniques
Modernist compositions
Spectral music